HalfNoise (often stylized as HALFNOISE) is the musical project of Zac Farro, drummer of the American rock band Paramore. Based in Nashville, Tennessee, Farro formed the project alongside Jason Clark following Farro's departure from Paramore in 2010. The project now consists of Farro alone. He released the debut self-titled EP of the project, HalfNoise, in 2012. Since then, he released four studio albums, Volcano Crowe (2014), Sudden Feeling (2016), Natural Disguise (2019) and Motif (2021) and two EPs The Velvet Face in 2017 and Flowerss in 2018.

History

Early career (2010–2011) 
HalfNoise was created two days after Zac Farro's departure from Paramore, under the original name "Tunnel". Zac took part in this new project, along with Jason Clark, releasing a song called "Hide Your Eyes" 

Farro and Clark had earlier been together in a band with Taylor York and Farro's brother Josh Farro prior to Paramore. The duo then renamed themselves "HalfNoise" due to other bands being named "Tunnel". In March 2011, it was announced that Farro would be joining his brother's band Novel American, but would still continue take part in HalfNoise.

HalfNoise EP (2012) 
After Farro left Paramore, he started working on HalfNoise's debut EP self-titled HalfNoise. The production was finished on 2011, Farro stated that he recorded almost all the instruments with his friend Daniel James, "I played all the drums, I did all the sampling. Me and a producer called Daniel James did the guitars together, but it was mainly just me performing." On June 14, 2012, HalfNoise released their first official single "Free the House" along with a music video. The song served as the lead single of the EP, which was released on October 1, 2012 in the UK through Xtra Mile Recordings and on October 2 through their official website. The EP composed of previous demos from 2010 and new material. Later in 2012, the EP was made available for free digital download through NoiseTrade.

Volcano Crowe (2013–2014) 
Farro posted via Instagram in August 2013 that he spent 7 months writing and recording a new full-length album with his friends and producer Daniel James. He also stated that the album is titled Volcano Crowe because he recorded the album at the bottom of a volcano and his friend Rowan Crowe was the reason he visited New Zealand in the first place. The album production was finished on September 29, 2013. On May 26, 2014, Farro premiered the album's first single, "Mountain", and on September 16 released he released the second single "Hurricane Love" with a music video of a live performance of the song at New Zealand. The album was released on September 30, 2014 via Bandcamp.

Sudden Feeling (2016) 
In June 2016, Farro released "Know the Feeling" as the lead single for his then untitled album. With the release of the title track, the album was revealed to be called Sudden Feeling. The full album was premiered on Billboard on September 6, and the album was released September 9, 2016. In December 2016, Farro released the music video for the title track via YouTube.

The Velvet Face EP (2017) 
On March 24, 2017, HalfNoise's second EP, The Velvet Face, was released. Farro said that the EP doesn't only "demonstrate the light heartedness of HalfNoise, but I think it also encompasses my own vulnerabilities musically and artistically. I feel like this EP encompasses the feeling you get from a full LP, but filtered through only 5 songs. This is definitely the most important piece of music, to me personally, that I've ever written or worked on to-date with HalfNoise. Not only was it special for me as an artist and writer but from my friends who played, collaborated, and shared with me in making something so special." The EP includes a collaboration with Paramore vocalist Hayley Williams in the song "As U Wave", band in which Farro returned the same month of the release of the EP, but still continue with Halfnoise. The songs "Scooby's In The Back" and "French Class" began to be interpreted by Paramore on their "After Laughter" tours.

The EP has three music videos: On March 7, 2017, Farro uploaded a music video for "French Class" on YouTube, on June 15, Farro uploaded a music video for "Someday" and on October 11, he uploaded a music video for "Scooby's In The Back".

Flowerss EP (2018) 
On February 23, 2018, Farro announced that he would release his new EP "Flowerss" on May 4 and released his new single of the same name that same day. Farro released the second single, "All That Love Is", on April 5.

A third single, "She Said", was released on April 13.

Influences 
Farro has stated that some of his influences include: Jimmy Eat World, Radiohead, Death Cab for Cutie, Mew, Paper Route, Sigur Ros, Supercar, Thrice, Sunny Day Real Estate and múm. Farro has been influenced by Dave Grohl (former drummer of Nirvana and current singer/songwriter of Foo Fighters and drummer for Them Crooked Vultures), William Goldsmith (former drummer of Sunny Day Real Estate and Foo Fighters, replaced by Taylor Hawkins) and Riley Breckenridge (drummer for the band, Thrice).

Members 
Current members
 Zac Farro – lead vocals, drums, percussion, keyboards, bass, guitar, programming (2010–present)

Touring members
 Logan MacKenzie – lead guitar (2014–present)
 Joseph Mullen – drums, percussion (2016–present)
 Gavin McDonald – percussion, backing vocals, additional drums (2019–present), main drums (2016)
 Daniel Kadawatha – rhythm guitar, keyboards, synthesizers, backing vocals (2016–present)
 Joey Howard – bass guitar, backing vocals (2017–present)

Former members
 Jason Clark – guitar (2010–2012)

Timeline

Discography

Studio albums 
 Volcano Crowe (2014)
 Sudden Feeling (2016)
  Natural Disguise (2019)
Motif (2021)

EPs 
 HalfNoise (2012)
 The Velvet Face (2017)
 Flowerss (2018)

Singles

Demos 
 "Don't Lie to Me" (2010)
 "Hide Your Eyes" (2010)
 "Erase Me" (2011)

References

External links

American musical duos
Indie rock musical groups from Tennessee
Musical groups established in 2010
Musical groups from Nashville, Tennessee
Rock music duos
2010 establishments in Tennessee